The 1976–77 season was Nottingham Forest's 112th year in existence and fifth campaign consecutive in the Second Division since their relegation in 1972.

Summary

During summer chairman BJ Appleby appointed Brighton & Hove Albion manager Peter Taylor as new assistant for Clough, now in his third season with the club. The 1972 First Division Champion Duo was reunited again after two campaigns now in Second Division. The club reinforced the squad with several players, for the offensive line arriving striker Garry Birtles from Long Eaton United, forward Peter Withe was bought from Birmingham City. and Taylor asked for the return of Tony Woodcock after a loan spell from Lincoln City F.C. The defensive line had a poor performance through September, Middleton replaced Wells as Goalkeeper starter and Taylor asked for the transfer in of central-back defender Larry Lloyd arriving from Coventry City during October allowing McGovern came back as midfielder. The squad clinched the promotion to First Division with a victory on the ultimate round finishing in a decent 3rd place. Also, the team won the Anglo-Scottish Cup during December after defeated Leyton Orient in the Finals with a massive 5–1 aggregate score.

Meanwhile, in League Cup the club advanced to the third round being defeated by Coventry City. In FA Cup the squad was eliminated in Fourth round after a replay against Southampton F.C.

Squad

Transfers

Statistics

Players statistics

The statistics for the following players are for their time during 1976–77 season playing for Nottingham Forest. Any stats from a different club during 1976–77 are not included. Includes all competitive matches.

Table

Results by round

Competitions

A list of Nottingham Forest's matches in the 1976–77 season.

Second Division

Matches

League Cup

Second round

Third round

FA Cup

Third round

Replay

Second Replay

Fourth round

Replay

Anglo-Scottish Cup

First round

Quarterfinals

Semifinals

Finals

References

Nottingham Forest F.C. seasons
Nottingham Forest F.C.